Tom Stoa (born July 7, 1951) was an American politician.

Stoa lived in Winona, Minnesota and graduated from Winona Senior High School. He received his bachelor's degree from Winona State University and served in the United States Merchant Marines. Stoa was also a beekeeper. Stoa served in the Minnesota House of Representatives from 1977 to 1980 and was a Democrat.

References

1951 births
Living people
People from Winona, Minnesota
Winona State University alumni
American beekeepers
United States Merchant Mariners
Democratic Party members of the Minnesota House of Representatives